Wayne J. Henke (born May 30, 1941) is a former high school teacher and coach, a retired farmer, and a former politician.  He served as a Democrat in the Missouri House of Representatives.  He lives in Troy, Missouri, with his wife, the former Dottie Prinster, and has nine children and eleven grandchildren.

He was born in Chesterfield, Missouri, later moving and graduating from the Lincoln County R-IV High School.  He received his bachelor's degree in education from University of Missouri.  He went on to become a high school teacher and coach for ten years.

In 1986, he was elected the Lincoln County Assessor.  He has also served on the Silex R-1 School Board.

He is a member of Sacred Heart Catholic Church, the Knights of Columbus, the Farm Bureau, the Lincoln County Fair Board (serving as chair in 1978), the Lincoln County Memorial Hospital Advisory Board (serving as chair in 1995), and the Lincoln County Democratic Club.  He has been recognized for his work by inclusion in Winfield, Missouri's R-IV Wall of Fame and the St. Charles County Amateur Baseball Hall of Fame.

He was first elected to the Missouri House of Representatives in 2002, winning reelection in 2004. In 2006 he ran for the Missouri Senate, losing to Scott Rupp. During his tenure in the House, he served on the following committees:
Appropriations - Agriculture and Natural Resources;
Health Care Policy;
Transportation;
Joint Committee on Transportation Oversight;
Joint Committee on Wetlands;
Joint Interim Committee on Intermodal Transportation;
Special Committee on Immigration Reform;
Interim Committee on Health Care Access and Affordability; and
Interim Committee on Transportation.

References
Official Manual, State of Missouri, 2005-2006. Jefferson City, MO: Secretary of State.
Missouri House of Representatives, Past Session Archives. Accessed at https://web.archive.org/web/20141016012831/http://www.house.mo.gov/sitemap.aspx?pid=24on October 11, 2014.

1941 births
Living people
People from Chesterfield, Missouri
Democratic Party members of the Missouri House of Representatives
People from Troy, Missouri
Missouri Tigers baseball players
American sports coaches
People from St. Charles County, Missouri
People from Lincoln County, Missouri
Sports coaches from Missouri
Catholics from Missouri
Schoolteachers from Missouri